Sheikh Abdullah II Sabah II Al-Jabir I Al-Sabah (1814 – 1892) was a cavalry commander in the Military of Kuwait, the fifth ruler of the Sheikhdom of Kuwait (1866 – 1892) and oldest son of the fourth ruler of Kuwait.  He spent much of his rule dealing with natural disasters, maintaining stability as well as building stronger ties with the Ottoman Empire which supplied the most vital resource in Kuwait, drinking water.  The first coins minted by Kuwait were issued during his reign.

Early life
Under the orders of his father, on 24 April 1841 Abdullah II signed a one-year naval truce with Samuel Hennell, who spoke on behalf of the British, which expired and was never renewed. The truce prohibited Kuwait from undertaking any form of maritime offense as well as giving all mediation efforts in maritime disputes over to the British Empire.

Reign
Abdullah ruled from November 1866 to 1892, inheriting a state that had undergone a century long increase in merchant marine and navy traffic with stable governance partly due to British support. Upon becoming ruler, he quickly pivoted towards the Ottoman Empire and away from the British. He also negotiated with the Al Saud family to maintain power. Throughout his reign he rebuffed requests from the British Commissioner, Lewis Pelly, speaking on behalf of the British Empire, to rise up against the Ottomans. He was considered a modest man with simple tastes. 

A great deal of this approval hinged on his relief work during natural disasters. In 1868 a great famine struck and he worked to bring an end to the rampant starvation. In September 1871 disaster struck again, this time in the maritime industry of Kuwait.  Hundreds of Kuwaiti pearling vessels were sunk along with their crews due to extremely high waves. Historians are split on whether this was due to great storms in the Indian Ocean or caused by the eruption of Bushehr.

In 1886–87, under Abdullah II, Kuwait began minting coins in copper due to the lack of Indian rupees circulating in the local economy.

Abdullah sided with the Jabir bin Mardaw, Emir of Khorramshar during the Basra and Muhamarrah conflict with the Al-Nasser tribe under his reign, and helped him consolidate power in the region.

Due to his allegiance to the Ottoman Empire, in 1871, Midhat Pasha gave him the title Kaymakam which means provincial sub-governor.

Physical description
In his later years he was described as tall with a heavy athletic body and a long white beard.  He wore a purple bisht made of silk and adorned with gold embroidery over a thawb, with a white silk scarf used as a belt. On both hands rested many diamond rings. At his waist was an ornate janbiya with a hilt made of solid gold, encrusted with pearls and gemstones.

Notes

External links

19th-century monarchs in the Middle East
19th-century Ottoman military personnel
1814 births
1892 deaths
House of Al-Sabah
Rulers of Kuwait
Arabs from the Ottoman Empire